Kumarimulla is a village close to Pugoda town western Sri Lanka.

Kumarimulla is located at  (6.9667 80.1167).

References 

Kumarimulla, Sri Lanka Page. Falling Rain. Retrieved on 2008-05-15.
Kumarimulla Map — Satellite Images of Kumarimulla. Maplandia.

Populated places in Western Province, Sri Lanka